Holy Wars is a 2010 documentary written and directed by Stephen Marshall. In 2009, Marshall was inspired to make the film due to the prevalence of religious fundamentalism during this time period.

Synopsis
Holy Wars is mostly filmed from the perspective of two missionaries, Khalid Kelly and Aaron Taylor. The film takes a look at the religious fundamentalism in Pakistan, Lebanon, United Kingdom, and the United States as well as the decades long conflict between Islam and Christianity. The film features several interviews, including one with author Sam Harris.

Screenings
In 2010 Holy Wars was screened at the 14th Annual IDA Docuweeks Showcase, the Kansas International Film Festival, and at the ArcLight Hollywood Theatre in Los Angeles, Ca.

Reception and awards
Bloomberg and IndieWire both positively reviewed the film, with IndieWire stating that "Holy Wars provides nuanced characters that provoke discussion and self-reflection." The film has also received a positive review from Variety, writing that the film was "a poignant, disturbing reminder of how lonely, and dangerous, the righter-than-thou road can be". Christianity Today called the film "riveting", saying that "what's also fascinating is the journey behind those journeys". The Orlando Sentinel's Roger Moore gave the film 2 1/2 stars, stating "Marshall tries to balance his film with two equally unbending and potentially violent fanatics. He doesn’t."

Awards

References

External links
 
 
 
 
 Faith and Fear: The Making of My Film 'Holy Wars'

Documentary films about religion
2010 films
2010 documentary films
American documentary films
2010s English-language films
2010s American films
English-language documentary films